Dmitrij Dmitrij  is an EP by indie rock band Oh No Oh My. It was named after their friend and European driver Dmitrij Rogovik.

Track listing
 "Wham Bam Thank You Spaceman" - (4:03)
 "The Boy With An Anchor" - (3:35)
 "Be A Star" - (3:05)
 "Go To Work" - (3:05)
 "I Painted Your House" - (4:07)

External links
Oh No Oh My on Last.fm
Oh No Oh My Official website
MySpace page

2008 EPs
Oh No Oh My albums